A pennyweight (dwt) is a unit of mass equal to 24 grains,  of a troy ounce,  of a troy pound, approximately 0.054857 avoirdupois ounce and exactly 1.55517384 grams. It is abbreviated dwt, d standing for denarius (an ancient Roman coin), and later used as the symbol of an old British penny (see £sd).

History
At that time, the pound unit in use in England was the Tower pound, equal to 7,680 Tower grains (also known as wheat grains). The medieval English pennyweight was thus equal to 32 Tower grains. When Troy weights replaced Tower weights in 1527, the Troy weights were defined in such a way that the old Tower pound came out to exactly 5,400 Troy grains (also known as barleycorns), the Tower pennyweight  Troy grains (and thus approximately 1.46 grams). After 1527, the English pennyweight was the Troy pennyweight. of 24 Troy grains.

Usage
The troy pound and the pennyweight lost their official status in the United Kingdom in the Weights and Measures Act of 1878; only the troy ounce and its decimal subdivisions remained official. The troy ounce enjoys a specific legal exemption from metrication in the UK.

The pennyweight is the common weight used in the valuation and measurement of precious metals. Jewellers use the pennyweight in calculating the amount and cost of precious metals used in fabricating or casting jewellery. Similarly, dentists and dental labs still use the pennyweight as the measure of precious metals in dental crowns and inlays.

Pennyweight and grains are still used to weigh gooseberries in competitions in Cheshire, northwest UK. Over the Pennines in Yorkshire the alternative drams and grains measurement has been used since a new set of scales was purchased by the Egton Bridge Old Gooseberry Society in 1937.

The most common abbreviation for pennyweight is dwt; d, for the Roman denarius, was the abbreviation for penny before Decimalisation of the British monetary system. Alternate abbreviations are pwt and PW.

Uses unrelated to weight

Although the abbreviations are the same, the pennyweight bears no relation to the weight of the American penny nail. That name is derived from the price for a hundred nails in 15th century England: the larger the nail, the higher the cost per hundred.
The pennyweight also bears no relation to the weight of the American "penny" (1 cent) coin, which weighs 2.5 g (for those minted after 1982).

Conversion

References

Obsolete units of measurement
Units of mass
Customary units of measurement in the United States